Jalal's Story is a 2014 Bangladeshi film directed by Abu Shahed Emon and produced by Faridur Reza Sagar. Character actors Arafat Rahman and Mohammad Emon play the lead roles. The film was selected as the Bangladeshi entry for the Best Foreign Language Film at the 88th Academy Awards, but it was not nominated.

Plot 
Just as Moses was found in the river Nile, an infant is rescued from a river, and adopted by Miraj, Karim and Sajib in turns over the years, only to be abandoned at the various stages of his life. From innocence to becoming a gangster, the unpredictable currents of Jalal's journey prove that he is truly a child of the river.

Cast
 Arafat Rahman 
 Tauquir Ahmed
 Mosharraf Karim 
 Moushumi Hamid
 Mohammad Emon

Awards

|-
| 2014
| New Current
| Busan International Film Festival
| 
|
|
|-
|2016
|Best Film
|19th Avanca International Film Festival
|
|
|
|-
|}

See also
 List of submissions to the 88th Academy Awards for Best Foreign Language Film
 List of Bangladeshi submissions for the Academy Award for Best Foreign Language Film

References

External links
 

2014 films
Bengali-language Bangladeshi films
Bangladeshi drama films
2010s Bengali-language films
Films set in Dhaka
2014 drama films
Impress Telefilm films